"Never Say Goodbye" is a song by American rock band Bon Jovi, written by Jon Bon Jovi and Richie Sambora. It was a track off the band's third album, Slippery When Wet, in June 15, 1987, and reached number 11 on the mainstream rock charts and number 21 in the UK Singles Chart. Because it was not released domestically as a commercially available single, "Never Say Goodbye" was ineligible to chart on the Billboard Hot 100; nevertheless, it reached number 28 on the Hot 100 Airplay survey.

The song was featured on some versions of the band's Cross Road greatest hits album and is still occasionally performed live by the band in concert.

Song style
"Never Say Goodbye" is a power ballad, featuring drawn out vocals and a slow tempo, in contrast to the other tracks on Slippery When Wet, which are of a much faster, metal pace.

The song is in the key of A major and progresses to C# minor, D major and D minor.

On one of the early demos and alternate takes that were made for this song, Richie Sambora sang lead vocals on only one of them while Jon Bon Jovi sang lead vocals on most of them.

Track listing
Original European Release (August 13, 1987)
 "Never Say Goodbye"
 "Shot Through the Heart" (Live)

US & UK CD "Re-Release"
 "Never Say Goodbye"
 "Social Disease"
 "Edge of a Broken Heart"
 "Raise Your Hands"

Charts

References 

1980s ballads
1986 songs
1987 singles
Bon Jovi songs
Glam metal ballads
Song recordings produced by Bruce Fairbairn
Songs written by Jon Bon Jovi
Songs written by Richie Sambora
Music videos directed by Wayne Isham
Mercury Records singles